Coreen Shire was a local government area in the Riverina region of New South Wales, Australia.

Coreen Shire was established in 1906 and its offices were based in the town of Corowa. Localities in the Shire included Balldale, Buraja, Coreen, Daysdale, Lowesdale, Hopefield, Rennie, Savernake and Warragoon.

In 1955 Coreen Shire was merged with the Municipality of Corowa to form Corowa Shire.

References

Former local government areas of New South Wales
1906 establishments in Australia
1955 disestablishments in Australia